Klimas Gusočenko (born 9 March 1989) is a Lithuanian professional footballer who most recently played for an A lyga club FK Palanga. He plays the position of defender and is 1.89 m tall.

References

External links

Living people
Lithuanian footballers
FC Šiauliai players
Flota Świnoujście players
FK Kauno Žalgiris players
Wisła Puławy players
FK Atlantas players
A Lyga players
I liga players
Lithuanian expatriate footballers
1989 births
Association football defenders